The 2001 Men's South American Volleyball Championship was the 24th edition of the event, organised by South America's governing volleyball body, the Confederación Sudamericana de Voleibol (CSV). It was hosted in Cali, Colombia from September 6 to September 8, 2001.

Preliminary round robin
Thursday 2001-09-06

Friday 2001-09-07

Saturday 2001-09-08

Final standings

Final ranking

Individual awards

References
 Results

Men's South American Volleyball Championships
S
Volleyball
V
2001 in South American sport
September 2001 sports events in South America